Folketing elections were held in Denmark on 26 February 1853. Christian Albrecht Bluhme of the Højre party remained Prime Minister after the elections, but after the government failed to win a vote on who would succeed King Frederick VII on 18 April by the three-quarters majority necessary, the legislature was dissolved and early elections were held in May.

Electoral system
The elections were held using first-past-the-post voting in single-member constituencies. Only 14% of the population was eligible to vote in the elections, with suffrage restricted to men over 30 who were not receiving poor relief (or who had not paid back any previous poor relief received), were not classed as "dependents" (those who were privately employed but did not have a household) and who had lived in their constituency for a certain length of time.

Results

References

General
1853 02
Denmark 1
Denmark